Candi Clarkson-De Gazon (née Clarkson born 30 November 1958) (other last names, Lohr/Jirik) is a Canadian basketball player. She competed in the women's tournament at the 1984 Summer Olympics. In 2013, she was inducted into the Canada Basketball Hall of Fame.

Awards and honors
Top 100 U Sports women's basketball Players of the Century (1920-2020).

References

External links
 

1958 births
Living people
Basketball people from Ontario
Canadian women's basketball players
Olympic basketball players of Canada
Basketball players at the 1984 Summer Olympics
Sportspeople from Hamilton, Ontario